Dead sand, a term used in aquarism that refers to sand that has not been populated by beneficial bacteria and other organisms unlike live sand.

References 

Fishkeeping
Aquariums